Symphonies of the Night is the fifth studio album by the German/Norwegian symphonic metal band Leaves' Eyes. It was released in Europe on 15 November 2013, and in the US on 26 November 2013, through Napalm Records. The record was produced by Alexander Krull at Mastersound Studio, Germany and features album artwork by Stefan Heilemann. Like previous albums, Symphonies of the Night features songs sung in different languages, including English, Shakespearean English, Norwegian, French and Irish. The album title was said to be inspired by Symphony of the Swan Lake by Tchaikovsky.

Track listing
All songs written and composed by Leaves' Eyes with the exception of "One Caress" written by Martin Gore.

Charts

Personnel
Leaves' Eyes
Liv Kristine Espenæs – vocals
Alexander Krull – vocals, production
Thorsten Bauer – guitar, bass guitar
Sander van der Meer – guitar
Felix Born – drums, percussion
Additional personnel
Carmen Elise Espenæs – guest vocals on "Eileen's Ardency"
Stefan Heilemann – album cover
Liesbeth De Weer "Elvya Dulcimer" – hammered dulcimer on "Nightshade"
 Joris Nijenhuis – Percussion

References

External links
 Official website
 

2013 albums
Leaves' Eyes albums
Napalm Records albums
Albums produced by Alexander Krull